Nava or NAVA may refer to:

Organizations 
 National Association for the Visual Arts in Australia
 North American Vexillological Association

Places 
 Nava, Jõgeva County, Estonia, a village
 Nava, Saare County, Estonia, a village
 Nava, Mazandaran, Iran, a village
 Nava, Coahuila, Mexico, a city
 Nava (municipality), Mexico
 Nava, Asturias, Spain, a municipality
 La Nava, Huelva, Spain, a town and municipality

Other uses 
 Nava (surname)
 Nava (given name)
 Neurally adjusted ventilatory assist, a mode of ventilation
 Navā, a dastgah in Persian traditional music
Nava, a Milan-based music group consisting of Francesco Fugazza, Nava Golchini, Elia Pastori and Marco Fugazza.

See also 
 Navas (disambiguation)